Červený (meaning "red" in Czech) may refer to:

People
 Frank S. Cerveny (born 1933), sixth bishop of the Episcopal Church in Florida
 Heather Cerveny, member of the United States Marine Corps, and a paralegal
 Jaroslav Červený, Czech footballer
 Rudolf Červený, Czech ice hockey player
  (1819–96), constructed the first Contrabass tuba, and was the first to use true rotary valves

Places
Červený Hrádok, a village and municipality in Zlaté Moravce District, Nitra Region, Slovakia
Červený Kameň, a village and municipality in Ilava District, Trenčín Region, Slovakia
Červený Kameň Castle, a castle near the village of Častá, Slovakia
Červený Kláštor, a small village and municipality in Kežmarok District, Prešov Region, Slovakia
Červený Kostelec, a town in Hradec Králové Region, Czech Republic

Czech-language surnames
Surnames from nicknames